Credlin is a surname. Notable people with the surname include:

Leo Credlin (1903–1983), Australian rules footballer
Peta Credlin (born 1971), Australian political commentator and public servant

See also
Redlin (surname)